Naphthali ben Levi (Henri) van Praag (September 12, 1916 in AmsterdamNovember 3, 1988 in Hilversum) was a Jewish-Dutch writer, teacher, and religious historian, and became known also for his publications in the field of parapsychology.

Childhood and education
Van Praag was the son of Esther Van Praag and diamond cutter Louis (Levi) van Praag. The family was Jewish but not religious. The family moved to Antwerp, where Van Praag attended elementary and high school.

In 1931 the family Van Praag was again registered in Amsterdam, and Henri attended the five-year course at the municipal training college (diploma 1936), where he met Leny van Huystee, whom he married in 1947. At this time his interest in mysticism led him to read Chinese sage Li, a Jewish mystic whose name he never mentioned, the theologian J. Eykman (1892-1945) and the philosopher-physicist-educator Dr Philip Kohnstamm (1875-1951). He also had a practice as a psychologist and psychotherapist.

Van Praag spent World War II in hiding, in Amsterdam and other places. Many of his relatives were deported to concentration camps, where more than seventy relatives were murdered. Leny maintained contact with him during this period.

Post-war career
After the war, Van Praag wanted to work for peace, and "turned [...] to people across all boundaries of religion, or national cultures. He exchanged as any other information from Judaism to Buddhism, of Taoism to gnosticism, from theology to science.

After obtaining the deed Dutch Language and Literature for secondary education (1946), he began an eagerness for several university studies: general philosophy of science, physics and pedagogy (Kohnstamm), logic (Evert Willem Beth), mathematics (L.E.J. Brouwer), biology (Heimans), sociology (Mennicken), economics (Mermans), general linguistics (Marcel Cohen), history (Jacques Presser), Judaica (Joseph B. Soloveitchik), psychology (Otto Selz) and phenomenology of religion and cultural anthropology (Gerard van der Leeuw). 
Meanwhile, he was heavily involved with the Jews returning from the camps, especially in children. He conducted research for the Institute for the Tropics. His first, not in book form, study number, time and space, (1949) deals with the psychological foundations of mathematics and physics. His first book, The Meaning of Education (1950), was devoted to education and ends with a passionate creed. He did bachelor's degree in 1950, Master's degree in 1951. Under the pseudonym Bernard Raimond, he published a novel in the style of mystical Meyrink, is waiting for you (1953), a document that attests to his deep interest in and knowledge of China, the Jewish mysticism and reincarnation.

Shortly after the war in 1946 Van Praag was director of teaching HBS (Aid Study). Hammelburg related to the pedagogic Social Work community, working at the Dutch Institute for Psychological Research in Hilversum. In 1949 he took part in the tenth congress of philosophy in Paris. In 1951, Van Praag pedagogical consultant at the Institute of his teacher Kohnstamm, the General Social Consulting.

At an international conference in 1952 the World Organization for Mutual Understanding and Co-operation (WOMUC) set up and Henri became chairman. Van Praag included Otto Frank, Anne Frank's father, Zvi Werblowsky and Karl Thieme. One of the initiatives that emerged from the conference was the plan for a three-part series Das Lebendige Gottes Wort, an anthology with commentary from Jewish and Christian writings on revelation, prayer and promise. Many scholars, including Martin Buber, had agreed to cooperate, Thieme and Van Praag would lead. The plan was not implemented in this form by the sudden death of Thieme and the departure of Van Praag to Montevideo.

Intermezzo Uruguay (1953-1954) 
Intermezzo Uruguay (1953-1954) in early 1950, the Soviet Union under Joseph Stalin to anti-Semitism. Van Praag in 1953 went to Uruguay to investigate whether this country a new home for Jewish children could be. He was visiting Montevideo in psychology, pedagogy and philosophy, while he also had a practice as a psychologist-therapist. All his life he would also like therapist (counselor) for fellows remain available, people who were on something or had a question, could always go to him for an interview or an opinion. He then listened to the other, conducted an interview and ended with this advice.

He also studied Chinese language and culture in Montevideo with Professor Li Yu-Ying (Li Shizeng), former Rector of the Imperial University of Peking. With Stalin's death and the arrival of Nikita Khrushchev in 1953 compared the situation for Jews in Russia to improve, so the mission had formed the reason for the trip to South America was halted.

In the center of society (1954-1973) 
In the center of society was founded in 1954 with his brother Henry I. (Dorus) van Praag and I.J. Sloos, and was aimed at improving the dialogue between Jews and Christians. With Jacob Soetendorp he worked on the series Phoenix Bible Paperbacks. Soetendorp translated large parts of the Old Testament again from Hebrew into Dutch, inspired by the new German translation of Martin Buber and Franz Rosenzweig. Van Praag had to finalize the 18 parts of Hebrew Bible, J. Goudoever of the final editing of the 12 parts of the New Testament. Van Praag also wrote the entire series of some forty articles and introductory and linking between texts and other items were the result of numerous conversations between Protestant and Catholic Christians, Jews and - to a lesser extent - Muslims.

Van Praag was also active in many areas. He was appointed in 1957 as a teacher at the local training college in 4 hours per week in pedagogy and in the same year was appointed professor at the LOI (Pelman Institute). In 1958 he became director of the Center for pedagogic Psychology in Amsterdam, in 1964 he was consultant and from 1966 senior lecturer of Teleac (a relationship that until 1977 would last), (main) editor for various publishers and magazines including Studium Generale, Effective Business Management and Intermediate. He was a valued partner of leading people in the scientific, religious, political and philosophical territory.

Professor (1973-1988) 
From 1973 to 1978 he was professor of sociology (religious schools) at the Wageningen Agricultural University. In 1974 we started with the establishment of the International Academy of Manternach (Luxembourg), with the first academic year of 1976. This academy was on March 15, 1979 as International University Lugano (Switzerland) continued and Van Praag was Chancellor and taught, among other methods, psychology and parapsychology. He was also rector of the Academy of Religion Vergleichende Geschichte in Duisburg (Germany), where he also taught religious studies.

In 1975 he founded the magazine Prana (magazine for spirituality and the periphery of science, publishing Ankh-Hermes) on. Prof. Van Praag had a good relationship with the publisher Paul Kluwer and was a consultant to the publisher.

In 1978 he succeeded Professor W.H.C. Tenhaeff as professor of parapsychology at the University of Utrecht, a position he held until 1986 would continue to play. Van Praag highlights in this field, that psychology should be seen as a border area of what is called parapsychology, as Einstein defined as a straight line curve with a degree of curvature = 0.

His wife Leny van Praag - Van Huystee deceased in 1981.

Bibliography 
Number, time and space, Mathematisch Centrum, 1949
The Meaning of Education, De Erven F. Bohn, 1950
Abraham Philip Kohnstamm, a man of God, Ten Have, 1952
Montessori for adults, World Window, 1952
The Amsterdam Conversation on Israel, The Voice of Israel, 1952
The message of Israel, World Window, 1952
Conversation between East and West, World Window, 1952
It is waiting for you, Van Stockum, 1953
Pro Justitia, The Cycle, 1954
Introduction to social sciences, Van Stockum, 1957
Commemorative Book for Prof.. Dr. Ph. A. Kohnstamm, Wolters, 1957
Psychology in theory and practice, De Haan Ph. 7, 1958
The world of animal unlocked De Haan Ph. 28, 1959
Mirror of Chinese civilization, Ph. De Haan. 26, 1960
Pedagogy in theory and practice, De Haan Ph. 29, 1960
In search of the unknown, Ph. De Haan. 33, 1960
Mau-mau - Cats in art and literature, Ph. De Haan. 51, 1961
À la découverte de l'algèbre, Marabout, Gerard, 1962
Wisdom and beauty of India, Ph. De Haan. 1975, 1962
Ethnographic encyclopedia, De Haan, 1962
The art of parenting, Ph. De Haan. 29, 1963
Compendium of psychology, Noordhoff, 1963 (re: Self-knowledge, mastic Press, 2005)
Psychological encyclopedia, De Haan, 1964
Textbook of psychology, Noordhoff, 1964
The vocation of the youth in becoming a Europe, NJG, 1964
The Jewish origins of Christianity, Moussault, 1964
The phenomenon of Israel, Moussault, 1965
Henrietta Szold, Noordhoff, 1965
Logic, Teleac, 1966
Sagesse de la Chine, Marabout, Gerard, 1966
Israel and the Arabs - Open letter A.P., 1967
The miracle of Persia, De Haan, 1967
Psychology in theory and practice, De Haan, 1967 (= 5 ° pressure release from 1958)
The art of parenting, De Haan, 1967
Psychological encyclopedia, De Haan, 1967
Humor, the secret weapon of democracy, AP, 1967
Formal education in middle school, Wolters-Noordhoff, 1968
Measuring and comparing Teleac / De Haan, 1968
Agreement in the Middle East?, A.P., 1968
The argument Solimon, V.T.B.V.D.B.D.B., 1968
Living philosophy Teleac / Slaterus University Press, 1969
Semitism, Zionism, De Haan, 1969
Introduction to Psychology, Wolters-Noordhoff, 1970
Dialogue of generations, De Haan, 1970
Information and energy, De Haan, 1970
Appeal to women, Ankh-Hermes, 1971
The eight gates of salvation, Bantam, 1972
Everything flows - Panta Rhei Teleac, 1972
Key to the philosophy, Agon Elsevier, 1972
Key to the philosophy (questions and assignments), Agon Elsevier, 1972
Acupuncture, Ankh-Hermes, 1972
Reincarnation, Remote Book, 1972
Whether printed ... Van Gorcum, 1972
Key words of the Bible - Our Father, Book Center, 1972
Diary of Moses Flinker, (1942-1943) Bantam, 1973
Inventaire de la parapsychology, France-Empire, 1973
From chair to chair, Samsom, 1973
Key to the I-Ching, Ankh-Hermes, 1974
Anything goes, Tele Book, 1974
Wisdom from East and West, Ankh-Hermes, 1974
Para Psychological library (10 parts):
1. Introduction to parapsychology Bantam, 1975
2. Telepathy and telekinesis Bantam, 1975
3. Psychic awareness Meulenhoff, 1975
4. Paranormal physicality Bantam, 1975
5. Paranormal identity Bantam, 1975
6. Paranormal events Bantam, 1975
7. Parapsychology and occultism Bantam, 1975
8. Parapsychology and religion Bantam, 1975
9. Parapsychology and evolution Bantam, 1975
10. Parapsychology and transformation Bantam, 1975
Everything else (4 parts):
1. A new heaven and a new earth Bantam, 1976
2. A world of one thousand artists Bantam, 1976
3. Thinking like playing Bantam, 1977
4. Magic in the service of mysticism Bantam, 1978
Dialogue of generations, Tele Book, 1976
Blueprint for a New World Book Center, 1976
Karl Marx, a prophet of our time, Ankh-Hermes, 1976
The four faces of Jerusalem, Bantam, 1976
Signs of humanity, Ankh-Hermes, 1976
The language of dreams - exploration and explanation, Bantam, 1977
Mirror of our times, Tele Book, 1978
Order and organization, Pandata, 1985
It is waiting for you (Second edition), Ankh-Hermes, 1986
Damit who blueht Erde - Das Phaenomen Israel, Scriba, 1986
The eight paths of mysticism (2 º pressure of the eight gates of salvation from 1972), Bantam, 1986
The language of dreams (reprint of 1977), Ankh-Hermes, 1986
Change, Pandata, 1986
Mystical wisdom and universal knowledge, Ankh-Hermes, 1986
Tao Te Ching, Ankh-Hermes, 1986
Artificial intelligence, Pandata, 1988
Translations, introductions, contributions
East and West seek God, The Cycle, 1955 (translation of C. Mayhew, Men Seeking God 1955)
The Middle East, Ph. De Haan. 18, 1959
In search of the unknown, Ph. De Haan. 33, 1960
Africa Alive, Ph. De Haan. 41, 1960
Encyclopedia of the Universe, De Haan, 1960
Everything you need to know, De Haan, 1961
À la découverte de l'algèbre, Marabout, Gerard, 1962
Ethnographic encyclopedia, De Haan, 1962
Le dossier Afrique, Marabout, Gerard, 1962
Phoenix Bible Pockets, (parts 1-30) De Haan, 1962-1965
Man and company tomorrow, Samsom, 1963
Man in society, technology and culture, Ph. De Haan. 27, 1964
How do we conquer the future?, Contact, 1964
Chronicle of St. Jansoog, Moussault, 1964
The Jewish origins of Christianity, Moussault, 1964
Henrietta Szold, Noordhoff, 1965
Encyclopedia for Young People (parts 1-10), De Haan, 1965-1967
From Buddha to Sartre (the Netherlands edited and introduced by Van Praag), Moussault, 1965
Social psychology, Wolters-Noordhoff, 1967
The world of tomorrow (with Whitlau WAC), Worker Press, 1968
Jewish press in the Netherlands and Germany, St. A. Frank, 1969
Studies on the Jewish background of the OT, Van Gorcum, 1969
Resonance of Anne Frank, Contact, 1970
A tribute to Anne Frank, Doubleday, 1970
Im Department für Schule, Kirche und State, Quelle & Meyer, 1970
In-service training, VUGA, 1970
Handbook for Managers (parts 1 and 2), Kluwer, 1970-1978
Gay dialogicus, Samsom, 1971
Views on ... Luitingh, 1972
Future Research (parts 1-3), Kluwer, 1972-1975
Whether printed ... Van Gorcum, 1972
Printing and communications, N.D.B., 1974
Perspektief '74, Intermediate, 1974
Liber amicorum - Arend Hauer, NCA, 1974
Bibeb - Interviews 1973 / 1977, Van Gennep, 1977
Hypnosis in practice, Ankh-Hermes, 1977
The bank in the world of tomorrow, NMB, 1978
Animal testing in modern society, Ankh-Hermes, 1978
My Judaism (Houwaart Dick (ed.) with contributions from Van Praag), Voorhoeve, 1980
A tribute to Anne Frank, Shogakukan, 1981
In 2000, Prisma, 1982
Experiments on humans, Ankh-Hermes, 1982
Shalom (Kruijf the TC and H. van der Sandt (eds.)), St. B. Folkertsma, 1983
Closer to Anne, Leopold, 1985
Man without Borders, BRT 1986
About the Unseen - presented to Henry van Praag, Ankh-Hermes, 1986
Psychic healing, Ankh-Hermes, 1988

References 

"I was King Solomon. Lo and behold, the next day a delegation from Ethiopia." Interview with Bibeb in the Netherlands Fri 12/01/1973
"Parapsychology and religion." Interview with Rex Brico in Elsevier Magazine 13/05/1978
"Prof.. Drs Henri van Praag:" I am an optimist culture, the last and only "" Interview with P. van der Eijk in the weekly Time 05/26/1978
"Drs. H. van Praag: an extraordinary man", obituary by Harm van den Berg, In: NRC Handelsblad 03.11.1988
"Henri van Praag: a major advisor and visionary," by Avraham Soetendorp obituary, in: Het Parool 04.11.1988
"Professor Henry (Abba) van Praag: Take it easy, do not hurry, you have the infinity for you." Surya memories of green, in: Prana No. 56, Summer 1989, pp. 63–73 Ankh-Hermes, Deventer
"Henri van Praag: the man behind Prana" by Hein van Dongen, in: Prana No. 100, April 1997, pp. 87–91 Ankh-Hermes, Deventer

Dutch psychologists
Dutch theologians
Academic staff of Wageningen University and Research
1988 deaths
1916 births
Writers from Amsterdam
20th-century psychologists